Syria participated in the 2005 Asian Indoor Games held in Bangkok, Thailand from November 12, 2005 to November 19, 2005.

Medals

Silver
  Indoor athletics
Women's 400 m: Munira Al-Saleh

See also
 Syria at the 2006 Asian Games

Asian Indoor Games
Nations at the 2005 Asian Indoor Games
Syria at the Asian Indoor Games